Luca Babbini (born 22 January 1988 in Carrara, Italy) is an Italian footballer .

Biography
Babbini was signed by Viareggio in 2008. That season he became the understudy of Alessio Arfè. In the next season he was the backup of Nicola Ravaglia. In 2010, he left for Crociati Noceto and Viareggio signed Giorgio Merlano and Carlo Pinsoglio from Juventus to replace Ravaglia and Babbini.

References

External links

1988 births
Italian footballers
Spezia Calcio players
Living people
Association football goalkeepers